Tokyo 1960 was a 1957 kaiju film directed by Teodorico C. Santos and starring Tessie Quintana and Zaldy Zshornack. It is a Filipino version of the first Godzilla movie. It is considered to be a lost film.

Cast 
 Tessie Quintana
 Eddie del Mar
 Zaldy Zshornack

References

External links 
 

1957 films
1957 horror films
1950s lost films
1950s action films
Philippine black-and-white films
1950s science fiction horror films
Lost Philippine films
Godzilla films
1950s Japanese films